This page lists all described genera and species of the spider family Desidae. , the World Spider Catalog accepts 330 species in 60 genera:

A

Akatorea

Akatorea Forster & Wilton, 1973
 Akatorea gracilis (Marples, 1959) (type) — New Zealand
 Akatorea otagoensis Forster & Wilton, 1973 — New Zealand

Amphinecta

Amphinecta Simon, 1898
 Amphinecta decemmaculata Simon, 1898 (type) — New Zealand
 Amphinecta dejecta Forster & Wilton, 1973 — New Zealand
 Amphinecta luta Forster & Wilton, 1973 — New Zealand
 Amphinecta mara Forster & Wilton, 1973 — New Zealand
 Amphinecta milina Forster & Wilton, 1973 — New Zealand
 Amphinecta mula Forster & Wilton, 1973 — New Zealand
 Amphinecta pika Forster & Wilton, 1973 — New Zealand
 Amphinecta pila Forster & Wilton, 1973 — New Zealand
 Amphinecta puka Forster & Wilton, 1973 — New Zealand
 Amphinecta tama Forster & Wilton, 1973 — New Zealand
 Amphinecta tula Forster & Wilton, 1973 — New Zealand

Austmusia

Austmusia Gray, 1983
 Austmusia kioloa Gray, 1983 — Australia (New South Wales)
 Austmusia lindi Gray, 1983 — Australia (Victoria)
 Austmusia wilsoni Gray, 1983 (type) — Australia (New South Wales)

B

Badumna

Badumna Thorell, 1890
 Badumna arguta (Simon, 1906) — Australia (Queensland)
 Badumna bimetallica (Hogg, 1896) — Central Australia
 Badumna blochmanni (Strand, 1907) — Australia (New South Wales)
 Badumna exilis Thorell, 1890 — Indonesia (Java)
 Badumna exsiccata (Strand, 1913) — Australia
 Badumna guttipes (Simon, 1906) — Australia (Victoria, Tasmania)
 Badumna hirsuta Thorell, 1890 (type) — Indonesia (Java)
 Badumna hygrophila (Simon, 1902) — Australia (Queensland)
 Badumna insignis (L. Koch, 1872) — Australia. Introducded to Japan, New Zealand
 Badumna javana (Strand, 1907) — Indonesia (Java)
 Badumna longinqua (L. Koch, 1867) — Eastern Australia. Introduced to USA, Mexico, Uruguay, Japan, New Zealand
 Badumna maculata (Rainbow, 1916) — Australia (Queensland)
 Badumna microps (Simon, 1908) — Australia (Western Australia)
 Badumna pilosa (Hogg, 1900) — Australia (Victoria)
 Badumna scalaris (L. Koch, 1872) — Australia (Queensland, central Australia)
 Badumna senilella (Strand, 1907) — Australia
 Badumna socialis (Rainbow, 1905) — Australia (New South Wales)
 Badumna tangae Zhu, Zhang & Yang, 2006 — China

Baiami

Baiami Lehtinen, 1967
 Baiami brockmani Gray, 1981 — Australia (Western Australia)
 Baiami glenelgi Gray, 1981 — Australia (Victoria)
 Baiami loftyensis Gray, 1981 — Australia (South Australia)
 Baiami montana Gray, 1981 — Australia (Western Australia)
 Baiami stirlingi Gray, 1981 — Australia (Western Australia)
 Baiami storeniformis (Simon, 1908) — Australia (Western Australia)
 Baiami tegenarioides (Simon, 1908) — Australia (Western Australia)
 Baiami torbayensis Gray, 1981 — Australia (Western Australia)
 Baiami volucripes (Simon, 1908) (type) — Australia (Western Australia)

Bakala

Bakala Davies, 1990
 Bakala episinoides Davies, 1990 (type) — Australia (Queensland)

Barahna

Barahna Davies, 2003
 Barahna booloumba Davies, 2003 (type) — Australia (Queensland, New South Wales)
 Barahna brooyar Davies, 2003 — Australia (Queensland)
 Barahna glenelg Davies, 2003 — Australia (Victoria)
 Barahna myall Davies, 2003 — Australia (New South Wales)
 Barahna scoria Davies, 2003 — Australia (Queensland)
 Barahna taroom Davies, 2003 — Australia (Queensland)
 Barahna toonumbar Davies, 2003 — Australia (New South Wales)
 Barahna yeppoon Davies, 2003 — Australia (Queensland, New South Wales)

Buyina

Buyina Davies, 1998
 Buyina halifax Davies, 1998 (type) — Australia (Queensland)
 Buyina yeatesi Davies, 1998 — Australia (Queensland)

C

Calacadia

Calacadia Exline, 1960
 Calacadia ambigua (Nicolet, 1849) — Chile
 Calacadia chilensis Exline, 1960 (type) — Chile
 Calacadia dentifera (Tullgren, 1902) — Chile
 Calacadia livens (Simon, 1902) — Chile
 Calacadia osorno Exline, 1960 — Chile
 Calacadia radulifera (Simon, 1902) — Chile
 Calacadia rossi Exline, 1960 — Chile

Cambridgea

Cambridgea L. Koch, 1872
 Cambridgea agrestis Forster & Wilton, 1973 — New Zealand
 Cambridgea ambigua Blest & Vink, 2000 — New Zealand
 Cambridgea annulata Dalmas, 1917 — New Zealand (Chatham Is.)
 Cambridgea antipodiana (White, 1849) (type) — New Zealand
 Cambridgea arboricola (Urquhart, 1891) — New Zealand
 Cambridgea australis Blest & Vink, 2000 — New Zealand
 Cambridgea decorata Blest & Vink, 2000 — New Zealand
 Cambridgea elegans Blest & Vink, 2000 — New Zealand
 Cambridgea elongata Blest & Vink, 2000 — New Zealand
 Cambridgea fasciata L. Koch, 1872 — New Zealand
 Cambridgea foliata (L. Koch, 1872) — New Zealand
 Cambridgea inaequalis Blest & Vink, 2000 — New Zealand
 Cambridgea insulana Blest & Vink, 2000 — New Zealand
 Cambridgea longipes Blest & Vink, 2000 — New Zealand
 Cambridgea mercurialis Blest & Vink, 2000 — New Zealand
 Cambridgea obscura Blest & Vink, 2000 — New Zealand
 Cambridgea occidentalis Forster & Wilton, 1973 — New Zealand
 Cambridgea ordishi Blest & Vink, 2000 — New Zealand
 Cambridgea pallidula Blest & Vink, 2000 — New Zealand
 Cambridgea peculiaris Forster & Wilton, 1973 — New Zealand
 Cambridgea peelensis Blest & Vink, 2000 — New Zealand
 Cambridgea plagiata Forster & Wilton, 1973 — New Zealand
 Cambridgea quadromaculata Blest & Taylor, 1995 — New Zealand
 Cambridgea ramsayi Forster & Wilton, 1973 — New Zealand
 Cambridgea reinga Forster & Wilton, 1973 — New Zealand
 Cambridgea secunda Forster & Wilton, 1973 — New Zealand
 Cambridgea simoni Berland, 1924 — New Caledonia
 Cambridgea solanderensis Blest & Vink, 2000 — New Zealand
 Cambridgea sylvatica Forster & Wilton, 1973 — New Zealand
 Cambridgea tuiae Blest & Vink, 2000 — New Zealand
 Cambridgea turbotti Forster & Wilton, 1973 — New Zealand

Canala

Canala Gray, 1992
 Canala longipes (Berland, 1924) — New Caledonia
 Canala magna (Berland, 1924) (type) — New Caledonia
 Canala poya Gray, 1992 — New Caledonia

Cicirra

Cicirra Simon, 1886
 Cicirra decemmaculata Simon, 1886 (type) — Australia (Tasmania)

Colcarteria

Colcarteria Gray, 1992
 Colcarteria carrai Gray, 1992 (type) — Australia (New South Wales)
 Colcarteria kempseyi Gray, 1992 — Australia (New South Wales)
 Colcarteria yessabah Gray, 1992 — Australia (New South Wales)

Corasoides

Corasoides Butler, 1929
 Corasoides angusi Humphrey, 2017 — Papua New Guinea
 Corasoides australis Butler, 1929 (type) — Australia
 Corasoides cowanae Humphrey, 2017 — Papua New Guinea
 Corasoides motumae Humphrey, 2017 — Australia (New South Wales)
 Corasoides mouldsi Humphrey, 2017 — Australia (Queensland)
 Corasoides nebula Humphrey, 2017 — Papua New Guinea
 Corasoides nimbus Humphrey, 2017 — Papua New Guinea
 Corasoides occidentalis Humphrey, 2017 — Australia (Western Australia)
 Corasoides stellaris Humphrey, 2017 — Papua New Guinea
 Corasoides terania Humphrey, 2017 — Australia (Queensland, New South Wales)

Cunnawarra

Cunnawarra Davies, 1998
 Cunnawarra cassisi Davies, 1998 — Australia (New South Wales)
 Cunnawarra grayi Davies, 1998 (type) — Australia (New South Wales)

D

Desis

Desis Walckenaer, 1837
 Desis bobmarleyi Baehr, Raven & Harms, 2017 — Australia (Queensland)
 Desis crosslandi Pocock, 1903 — Tanzania (Zanzibar), Madagascar, Comoros, Mayotte
 Desis formidabilis (O. Pickard-Cambridge, 1891) — South Africa
 Desis galapagoensis Hirst, 1925 — Ecuador (Galapagos Is.)
 Desis gardineri Pocock, 1904 — India (Laccadive Is.)
 Desis inermis Gravely, 1927 — India
 Desis japonica Yaginuma, 1956 — Japan
 Desis kenyonae Pocock, 1902 — Australia (Victoria, Tasmania)
 Desis marina (Hector, 1877) — New Caledonia, New Zealand (mainland, Chatham Is.)
 Desis martensi L. Koch, 1872 — Malaysia
 Desis maxillosa (Fabricius, 1793) (type) — New Guinea, New Caledonia
 Desis risbeci Berland, 1931 — New Caledonia
 Desis tangana Roewer, 1955 — East Africa
 Desis vorax L. Koch, 1872 — Samoa

Dunstanoides

Dunstanoides Forster & Wilton, 1989
 Dunstanoides angustiae (Marples, 1959) — New Zealand
 Dunstanoides hesperis (Forster & Wilton, 1973) (type) — New Zealand
 Dunstanoides hinawa (Forster & Wilton, 1973) — New Zealand
 Dunstanoides hova (Forster & Wilton, 1973) — New Zealand
 Dunstanoides kochi (Forster & Wilton, 1973) — New Zealand
 Dunstanoides mira (Forster & Wilton, 1973) — New Zealand
 Dunstanoides montana (Forster & Wilton, 1973) — New Zealand
 Dunstanoides nuntia (Marples, 1959) — New Zealand
 Dunstanoides salmoni (Forster & Wilton, 1973) — New Zealand

E

Epimecinus

Epimecinus Simon, 1908
 Epimecinus alkirna Gray, 1973 — Australia (Western Australia)
 Epimecinus humilis Berland, 1924 — New Caledonia
 Epimecinus nexibilis (Simon, 1906) (type) — New Caledonia
 Epimecinus pullatus (Simon, 1906) — New Caledonia

F

Forsterina

Forsterina Lehtinen, 1967
 Forsterina alticola (Berland, 1924) — New Caledonia
 Forsterina annulipes (L. Koch, 1872) — Australia (Queensland, New South Wales, Lord Howe Is.)
 Forsterina armigera (Simon, 1908) — Australia (Western Australia)
 Forsterina cryphoeciformis (Simon, 1908) (type) — Australia (Western Australia)
 Forsterina koghiana Gray, 1992 — New Caledonia
 Forsterina segestrina (L. Koch, 1872) — Australia (New South Wales)
 Forsterina velifera (Simon, 1908) — Australia (Western Australia)
 Forsterina virgosa (Simon, 1908) — Australia (Western Australia)
 Forsterina vultuosa (Simon, 1908) — Australia (Western Australia)

G

Goyenia

Goyenia Forster, 1970
 Goyenia electa Forster, 1970 (type) — New Zealand
 Goyenia fresa Forster, 1970 — New Zealand
 Goyenia gratiosa Forster, 1970 — New Zealand
 Goyenia lucrosa Forster, 1970 — New Zealand
 Goyenia marplesi Forster, 1970 — New Zealand
 Goyenia multidentata Forster, 1970 — New Zealand
 Goyenia ornata Forster, 1970 — New Zealand
 Goyenia sana Forster, 1970 — New Zealand
 Goyenia scitula Forster, 1970 — New Zealand
 Goyenia sylvatica Forster, 1970 — New Zealand

H

Helsonia

Helsonia Forster, 1970
 Helsonia plata Forster, 1970 (type) — New Zealand

Holomamoea

Holomamoea Forster & Wilton, 1973
 Holomamoea foveata Forster & Wilton, 1973 (type) — New Zealand

Huara

Huara Forster, 1964
 Huara antarctica (Berland, 1931) (type) — New Zealand (Auckland Is.)
 Huara chapmanae Forster & Wilton, 1973 — New Zealand
 Huara decorata Forster & Wilton, 1973 — New Zealand
 Huara dolosa Forster & Wilton, 1973 — New Zealand
 Huara grossa Forster, 1964 — New Zealand (Auckland Is.)
 Huara hastata Forster & Wilton, 1973 — New Zealand
 Huara inflata Forster & Wilton, 1973 — New Zealand
 Huara kikkawa Forster & Wilton, 1973 — New Zealand
 Huara marplesi Forster & Wilton, 1973 — New Zealand
 Huara mura Forster & Wilton, 1973 — New Zealand
 Huara ovalis (Hogg, 1909) — New Zealand (Snares Is.)
 Huara pudica Forster & Wilton, 1973 — New Zealand

I

Ischalea

Ischalea L. Koch, 1872
 Ischalea incerta (O. Pickard-Cambridge, 1877) — Madagascar
 Ischalea longiceps Simon, 1898 — Mauritius
 Ischalea spinipes L. Koch, 1872 (type) — New Zealand

J

Jalkaraburra

Jalkaraburra Davies, 1998
 Jalkaraburra alta Davies, 1998 (type) — Australia (Queensland)

K

Keera

Keera Davies, 1998
 Keera longipalpis Davies, 1998 (type) — Australia (New South Wales)

L

Lathyarcha

Lathyarcha Simon, 1908
 Lathyarcha cinctipes (Simon, 1906) — Australia (Victoria)
 Lathyarcha inornata (L. Koch, 1872) — Australia (Queensland, New South Wales)
 Lathyarcha tetrica Simon, 1908 (type) — Australia (Western Australia)

M

Magua

Magua Davies, 1998
 Magua wiangaree Davies, 1998 (type) — Australia (New South Wales)

Makora

Makora Forster & Wilton, 1973
 Makora calypso (Marples, 1959) — New Zealand
 Makora detrita Forster & Wilton, 1973 — New Zealand
 Makora diversa Forster & Wilton, 1973 — New Zealand
 Makora figurata Forster & Wilton, 1973 (type) — New Zealand
 Makora mimica Forster & Wilton, 1973 — New Zealand

Mamoea

Mamoea Forster & Wilton, 1973
 Mamoea assimilis Forster & Wilton, 1973 — New Zealand
 Mamoea bicolor (Bryant, 1935) — New Zealand
 Mamoea cantuaria Forster & Wilton, 1973 — New Zealand
 Mamoea cooki Forster & Wilton, 1973 — New Zealand
 Mamoea florae Forster & Wilton, 1973 — New Zealand
 Mamoea grandiosa Forster & Wilton, 1973 — New Zealand
 Mamoea hesperis Forster & Wilton, 1973 — New Zealand
 Mamoea hughsoni Forster & Wilton, 1973 — New Zealand
 Mamoea inornata Forster & Wilson, 1973 — New Zealand
 Mamoea mandibularis (Bryant, 1935) — New Zealand
 Mamoea maorica Forster & Wilton, 1973 — New Zealand
 Mamoea montana Forster & Wilton, 1973 — New Zealand
 Mamoea monticola Forster & Wilton, 1973 — New Zealand
 Mamoea otira Forster & Wilton, 1973 — New Zealand
 Mamoea pilosa (Bryant, 1935) — New Zealand
 Mamoea rakiura Forster & Wilton, 1973 — New Zealand
 Mamoea rufa (Berland, 1931) (type) — New Zealand (Campbell Is.)
 Mamoea unica Forster & Wilton, 1973 — New Zealand
 Mamoea westlandica Forster & Wilton, 1973 — New Zealand

Mangareia

Mangareia Forster, 1970
 Mangareia maculata Forster, 1970 (type) — New Zealand
 Mangareia motu Forster, 1970 — New Zealand

Maniho

Maniho Marples, 1959
 Maniho australis Forster & Wilton, 1973 — New Zealand
 Maniho cantuarius Forster & Wilton, 1973 — New Zealand
 Maniho centralis Forster & Wilton, 1973 — New Zealand
 Maniho insulanus Forster & Wilton, 1973 — New Zealand
 Maniho meridionalis Forster & Wilton, 1973 — New Zealand
 Maniho ngaitahu Forster & Wilton, 1973 — New Zealand
 Maniho otagoensis Forster & Wilton, 1973 — New Zealand
 Maniho pumilio Forster & Wilton, 1973 — New Zealand
 Maniho tigris Marples, 1959 (type) — New Zealand
 Maniho vulgaris Forster & Wilton, 1973 — New Zealand

Manjala

Manjala Davies, 1990
 Manjala pallida Davies, 1990 — Australia (Queensland)
 Manjala plana Davies, 1990 (type) — Australia (Queensland)
 Manjala spinosa Davies, 1990 — Australia (Queensland)

Matachia

Matachia Dalmas, 1917
 Matachia australis Forster, 1970 — New Zealand
 Matachia livor (Urquhart, 1893) — New Zealand
 Matachia marplesi Forster, 1970 — New Zealand
 Matachia ramulicola Dalmas, 1917 (type) — New Zealand
 Matachia similis Forster, 1970 — New Zealand

Mesudus

Mesudus Özdikmen, 2007
 Mesudus frondosus (Forster, 1970) — New Zealand
 Mesudus setosus (Forster, 1970) — New Zealand
 Mesudus solitarius (Forster, 1970) (type) — New Zealand

Metaltella

Metaltella Mello-Leitão, 1931
 Metaltella arcoiris (Mello-Leitão, 1943) — Chile
 Metaltella iheringi (Keyserling, 1891) (type) — Brazil, Argentina
 Metaltella imitans (Mello-Leitão, 1940) — Argentina
 Metaltella rorulenta (Nicolet, 1849) — Peru, Chile, Argentina
 Metaltella simoni (Keyserling, 1878) — Brazil, Uruguay, Argentina. Introduced to USA, Canada
 Metaltella tigrina (Mello-Leitão, 1943) — Argentina

N

Namandia

Namandia Lehtinen, 1967
 Namandia periscelis (Simon, 1903) (type) — Australia (Tasmania)

Nanocambridgea

Nanocambridgea Forster & Wilton, 1973
 Nanocambridgea gracilipes Forster & Wilton, 1973 (type) — New Zealand

Neororea

Neororea Forster & Wilton, 1973
 Neororea homerica Forster & Wilton, 1973 — New Zealand
 Neororea sorenseni (Forster, 1955) (type) — New Zealand (Auckland Is.)

Notomatachia

Notomatachia Forster, 1970
 Notomatachia cantuaria Forster, 1970 — New Zealand
 Notomatachia hirsuta (Marples, 1962) (type) — New Zealand
 Notomatachia wiltoni Forster, 1970 — New Zealand

Nuisiana

Nuisiana Forster & Wilton, 1973
 Nuisiana arboris (Marples, 1959) (type) — New Zealand

O

Oparara

Oparara Forster & Wilton, 1973
 Oparara karamea Forster & Wilton, 1973 — New Zealand
 Oparara vallus (Marples, 1959) (type) — New Zealand

P

Panoa

Panoa Forster, 1970
 Panoa contorta Forster, 1970 (type) — New Zealand
 Panoa fiordensis Forster, 1970 — New Zealand
 Panoa mora Forster, 1970 — New Zealand
 Panoa tapanuiensis Forster, 1970 — New Zealand

Paramamoea

Paramamoea Forster & Wilton, 1973
 Paramamoea aquilonalis Forster & Wilton, 1973 — New Zealand
 Paramamoea arawa Forster & Wilton, 1973 — New Zealand
 Paramamoea incerta Forster & Wilton, 1973 (type) — New Zealand
 Paramamoea incertoides Forster & Wilton, 1973 — New Zealand
 Paramamoea insulana Forster & Wilton, 1973 — New Zealand
 Paramamoea pandora Forster & Wilton, 1973 — New Zealand
 Paramamoea paradisica Forster & Wilton, 1973 — New Zealand
 Paramamoea parva Forster & Wilton, 1973 — New Zealand
 Paramamoea urewera Forster & Wilton, 1973 — New Zealand
 Paramamoea waipoua Forster & Wilton, 1973 — New Zealand

Paramatachia

Paramatachia Dalmas, 1918
 Paramatachia ashtonensis Marples, 1962 — Australia (New South Wales)
 Paramatachia cataracta Marples, 1962 — Australia (New South Wales)
 Paramatachia decorata Dalmas, 1918 (type) — Australia (Queensland)
 Paramatachia media Marples, 1962 — Australia (Victoria)
 Paramatachia tubicola (Hickman, 1950) — Australia (South Australia, Tasmania)

Penaoola

Penaoola Davies, 1998
 Penaoola algida Davies, 1998 (type) — Australia (South Australia)
 Penaoola madida Davies, 1998 — Australia (South Australia)

Phryganoporus

Phryganoporus Simon, 1908
 Phryganoporus candidus (L. Koch, 1872) (type) — Australia (mainland, Norfolk Is.)
 Phryganoporus davidleei Gray, 2002 — Australia (Western Australia, South Australia)
 Phryganoporus melanopygus Gray, 2002 — Australia (Western Australia)
 Phryganoporus nigrinus Simon, 1908 — Australia (Western Australia to Queensland)
 Phryganoporus vandiemeni (Gray, 1983) — Australia (Victoria, Tasmania)

Pitonga

Pitonga Davies, 1984
 Pitonga woolowa Davies, 1984 (type) — Northern Australia

Poaka

Poaka Forster & Wilton, 1973
 Poaka graminicola Forster & Wilton, 1973 (type) — New Zealand

Porteria

Porteria Simon, 1904
 Porteria albopunctata Simon, 1904 (type) — Chile

Q

Quemusia

Quemusia Davies, 1998
 Quemusia aquilonia Davies, 1998 (type) — Australia (Queensland)
 Quemusia austrina Davies, 1998 — Australia (Queensland)
 Quemusia cordillera Davies, 1998 — Australia (New South Wales)
 Quemusia raveni Davies, 1998 — Australia (Queensland)

R

Rangitata

Rangitata Forster & Wilton, 1973
 Rangitata peelensis Forster & Wilton, 1973 (type) — New Zealand

Rapua

Rapua Forster, 1970
 Rapua australis Forster, 1970 (type) — New Zealand

Reinga

Reinga Forster & Wilton, 1973
 Reinga apica Forster & Wilton, 1973 — New Zealand
 Reinga aucklandensis (Marples, 1959) — New Zealand
 Reinga grossa Forster & Wilton, 1973 — New Zealand
 Reinga media Forster & Wilton, 1973 (type) — New Zealand
 Reinga waipoua Forster & Wilton, 1973 — New Zealand

Rorea

Rorea Forster & Wilton, 1973
 Rorea aucklandensis Forster & Wilton, 1973 (type) — New Zealand (Auckland Is.)
 Rorea otagoensis Forster & Wilton, 1973 — New Zealand

S

Syrorisa

Syrorisa Simon, 1908
 Syrorisa misella (Simon, 1906) (type) — New Caledonia, Australia (Western Australia)

T

Tanganoides

Tanganoides Davies, 2005
 Tanganoides acutus (Davies, 2003) — Australia (Tasmania)
 Tanganoides clarkei (Davies, 2003) — Australia (Tasmania)
 Tanganoides collinus (Davies, 2003) — Australia (Tasmania)
 Tanganoides greeni (Davies, 2003) (type) — Australia (Tasmania)
 Tanganoides harveyi (Davies, 2003) — Australia (Victoria)
 Tanganoides mcpartlan (Davies, 2003) — Australia (Tasmania)

Taurongia

Taurongia Hogg, 1901
 Taurongia ambigua Gray, 2005 — Australia (Victoria)
 Taurongia punctata (Hogg, 1900) (type) — Australia (Victoria)

Tuakana

Tuakana Forster, 1970
 Tuakana mirada Forster, 1970 — New Zealand
 Tuakana wiltoni Forster, 1970 (type) — New Zealand

W

Waterea

Waterea Forster & Wilton, 1973
 Waterea cornigera Forster & Wilton, 1973 (type) — New Zealand

References

Desidae
Desidae